Officially, among Japanese names there are 291,129 different Japanese surnames, as determined by their kanji, although many of these are pronounced and romanized similarly. Conversely, some surnames written the same in kanji may also be pronounced differently.  The top 10 surnames cover approximately 10% of the population, while the top 100 surnames cover slightly more than 33%.

This ranking is a result of an August 2008 study  by Meiji Yasuda Life Insurance Company, which  included approximately 6,118,000 customers of Meiji Yasuda's insurance and annuities.

References

Japanese names
Names by culture
 Japanese culture
Japanese